Philipp Kilian (1628 in Augsburg – 1693 in Augsburg), was a German Baroque engraver.

Biography
According to Houbraken he engraved the portrait of Johann Heinrich Roos which Roos's teacher Barent Graat sent him when he was writing his Schouburgh. Kilian made the engraving for Joachim von Sandrart, whose Teutsche Academie he illustrated.

According to the RKD he was the son of the engraver Wolfgang Kilian and brother to Bartholomaus. Besides engraving Sandrart's portrait, he made engravings after paintings by Karel Skreta, Philippe de Champaigne, and Johann Carl Loth.

References

Sources
 Philipp Kilian on Sandrart.net

External links
 

1628 births
1693 deaths
Kilian family
17th-century engravers